The heligonka or helikónka (in Slovak: heligónka) is a Czech,  Slovak and a Polish mountains (Beskid Żywiecki region) diatonic button accordion, similar to the Alpine Steirische Harmonika. Like the latter, the heligonka differs from other types of diatonic button accordions by having a supplemented and amplified bass part.

See also 
 Bandoneon

References 

Czech musical instruments
accordion